Albert Lebourg (1 February 1849, in Montfort-sur-Risle –  6 January 1928, in Rouen), birth name Albert-Marie Lebourg, also called Albert-Charles Lebourg and Charles Albert Lebourg, was a French Impressionist and Post-Impressionist landscape painter of the Rouen School (l'École de Rouen). Member of the Société des Artistes Français, he actively worked in a luminous Impressionist style, creating more than 2,000 landscapes during his lifetime. The artist was represented by Galerie Mancini in Paris in 1896, in 1899 and 1910 by : Galerie Bernheim-Jeune, 1903 and 1906 at the Galerie Paul Rosenberg, and 1918 and 1923 at Galerie Georges Petit.

Early life 
Initially studying at Évreux Lycée, Albert Lebourg, with interests in architecture, entered the École des Beaux-Arts of Rouen at a very young age. He studied art with Gustave Morin at l'Academie de peinture et de dessins, Rouen. Afterward, the artist was briefly a student of Jean-Paul Laurens. In 1876, Lebourg exhibited his works for the first time together with Claude Monet, Alfred Sisley, Pierre-Auguste Renoir, and other artists on the Boulevard Montmartre. Lebourg was referred to be appointed as a drawing professor at the Société des Beaux-Arts in Algiers after being noticed in Rouen by the art collector Laurent Laperlier. There he met Jean Seignemartin, who he inspired to bring more clarity and light into his paintings. In 1873 Lebourg married and remained in Algiers until the summer of 1877 when he resigned from his teaching position and returned to Paris with numerous paintings of the casbah, mosques and the Admiralty.

Career 
In the Fourth Impressionist Exhibition of 1879 Lebourg exhibited 30 works with Claude Monet, Camille Pissarro and Edgar Degas, presenting paintings and drawings executed in Algiers. In the Fifth Impressionist Exhibition or 1880 he exhibited 20 works depicting Rouen, Paris and Algiers. In 1883 he was admitted to the Salon (Paris) with his work entitled Matinée à Dieppe. In 1887 he exhibited at the acclaimed Les XX exhibition, with Walter Sickert, Camille Pissarro, Berthe Morisot and Georges-Pierre Seurat exhibit, with Seurat and Signac present at the opening. The major work shown is Seurat's A Sunday Afternoon on the Island of La Grande Jatte.

Lebourg remained occupied in all four seasons painting animated scenes of the Seine in and near Rouen and Paris. He energetically painted in Auvergne, Normandy and Île-de-France, finally settling in Puteaux where he remained from 1888 to 1895, availing himself to the surroundings of Paris, painting what he would regard as his best works. He wrote at the time:

"I will paint often at the banks of the Seine: Nanterre, Rueil, Chatou, Bougival, Port-Marly. These are a source of themes and very beautiful landscapes". (Lebourg)

He became a member of the Société des Artistes Français beginning in 1893.

Lebourg moved to the Netherlands in 1895, where he would stay two years. He exhibited to great acclaim at the Mancini Gallery in Paris and won the silver medal at the Exposition Universelle (1900). In 1903 a retrospective exhibition was organized presenting 111 works at the Gallerie Rosenberg, the art gallery of Paul Rosenberg at 21 rue de la Boétie in Paris. While his fame was firmly established by 1910 he continued exhibiting annually at the Salon. In 1918 another retrospective was organized in Paris.

At the home of Impressionist art collector François Depeaux (1853–1920), Lebourg had the opportunity to converse many times with Camille Pissarro, Claude Monet, and Robert Antoine Pinchon (an artist who greatly admired him).

13 November 1909, the Musée des Beaux-Arts de Rouen opened a show with fifty-two paintings: thirteen by Lebourg, three by Monet, nine by Sisley, one by Renoir, three by Armand Guillaumin, five by Joseph Delattre, two by Charles Frechon and four by Robert Antoine Pinchon. And in 1918, in the same museum, Lebourg was represented along with Bonnard, Boudin, Camoin, Cross, Guillaumin, Luce, Matisse, Monet, Signac and Vuillard and Pinchon.

He suffered a stroke in September 1920 that paralyzed the left side of his body. He nevertheless remarried in February 1921. A Catalogue Raisonné was organized that year that included 2,137 works and was released in 1923, which garnered united praise by the press.

He was named Chevalier of the Legion of Honour on 27 June 1903, and breveted Officer of the Legion of Honour 22 April 1924

Albert Lebourg died in Rouen on 7 January 1928.
Lebourg's works are exhibited at the Musée d’Orsay, Petit-Palais and Carnavalet in Paris, as well as museums in Bayonne, Clermont-Ferrand, Le Havre, Dunkerque, Lille, Strasbourg, Sceaux and above all Rouen at the Musée des Beaux-Arts de Rouen (François Depeaux collection).

Selected works 
 Lebourg, Le quai de la Tournelle et Notre-Dame de Paris, 1909, Musée Marmottan Monet, Paris
 View of Pont-du-Château, 1885, Hermitage Museum, Saint Saint Petersburg
 Remorqueurs à Rouen, Musée d'Orsay, Paris
 L'Île Lacroix sous la neige, Musée des Beaux-Arts de Rouen
 Navire norvégien dans le port de Rouen, Musée des Beaux-Arts de Rouen
 La Seine à Rouen, Musée des Beaux-Arts de Lyon
 La Seine à Croisset, Musée de la Chartreuse de Douai
 Faure Museum (Aix-les-Bains), Savoie
 Neige à Pont-du-Château, 1885, Musée d'art Roger-Quilliot, Clermont-Ferrand
 Neige à Pont-du-Château, Au Musée d'Évreux (Dépôt du Musée du Louvre), 1983, (inv. R.F. 1973-6).
 Vue de la Seine au bas Meudon, 1893, Musée de l'Île-de-France, Sceaux, Hauts-de-Seine
 Le pont de Neuilly du côté de Courbevoie, Musée de l'Île-de-France, Sceaux, Hauts-de-Seine
 The Seine at La Bouille, ca.1904-10, National Museum of Western Art, Tokyo
 La Seine près de Saint-Cloud, North Carolina Museum of Art
 Le Port d'Anvers (The Harbor at Anvers), 1895–1897, Phoenix Art Museum
 La Rue de Bouchers à Algers, 1873, Ger Eenens Collection the Netherlands

Gallery

Further reading 
 Léonce Bénédite, Albert Lebourg, Georges Petit, Paris, 1923
 François Lespinasse, L'École de Rouen, Fernandez, Sotteville-lès-Rouen, 1980
 François Lespinasse, Albert Lebourg 1849–1928, Rouen, 1983
 François Lespinasse, L'École de Rouen, Lecerf, Rouen, 1995 
 L'École de Rouen de l'impressionnisme à Marcel Duchamp 1878–1914, Musée des Beaux-Arts de Rouen, 1996 
 Marc-Henri Tellier, François Depeaux (1853–1920) le charbonnier et les impressionnistes, Rouen, Editions Marc-Henri Tellier, 2010 
 Mathilde Legendre et François Lespinasse, Albert Lebourg, Itinéraire d'un impressionniste normand, Pont-Audemer, édité en 2009 et réédité en janvier 2012 , Musée Alfred-Canel, p. 82, (exhibition 10 October 2009 through 17 January 2010).
Albert Lebourg: Peintre Paysagiste, November 1955, Gimpel Fils, 1955
Armand Guillaumin and Albert Lebourg, Barbizon House (London, England), 1930
Exposition Albert Lebourg: 23 novembre – 20 décembre 1976
Exhibition of Paintings with Works by Albert Lebourg, Barbizon House, 1930
Albert Lebourg, 1849–1928, Musée Eugène Boudin (Honfleur, Calvados), Musée de la Chartreuse (Douai, Nord), 1989
Albert Lebourg (1849–1928): Documentation... Jean-Albert Cartier, 1955
Albert Lebourg: un impressionniste au fil de l'eau, Musée Fournaise (Chatou, Yvelines), 2002
Le Paysagiste Albert Lebourg, Samuel Frère, 1911
100 dessins par Albert Lebourg, Hôtel Drouot, 1986
Les cahiers d'art-documents: Albert Lebourg, 1849–1928, 1955
 Exposition A. Lebourg (1849–1928), Galerie Serret-Fauveau, 1955
 Exposition de tableaux par Albert Lebourg: appartenant à divers amateurs au profit des sinistrés du Japon : ouverte du 3 au 19 novembre 1923, Galeries Georges Petit, 1923
Le paysagiste Albert Lebourg, 1910
Albert Lebourg, itinéraire d'un impressionniste normand, Mathilde Legendre, François Lespinasse, Musée Alfred Canel (Pont-Audemer, Eure), 2012
Exposition rétrospective des oeuvres d'Albert Lebourg du 30 avril au 29 mai 1932 [Rouen, Musée], 1932
L'Oeuvre d'Albert Lebourg dans les collections publiques, Madame Marcais, 1983
 Tableaux par A. Guillaumin et Albert Lebourg, Hôtel Drouot, 1937
Exposition rétrospective des œuvres de Lebourg, Albert Lebourg, Galerie Haussmann,
Albert Lebourg: 1849–1928 : Exposition du 26 mai au 27 juin 1970, Issue 2, Galerie Jean-Paul Wick [Paris], 1970
American Art Association, François Charles Cachoud, 1928
Neo-impressionist Painters: A Sourcebook on Georges Seurat, Camille Pissarro [...], Russell T. Clement, Annick Houzé, 1999
Gauguin and Impressionism, Richard R. Brettell, Anne-Birgitte Fonsmark, 2007
Modern France. A Companion to French Studies, Arthur Tilley, 1967
The Letters of Gustave Flaubert: 1857–1880, Gustave Flaubert, Francis Steegmuller, 1982
The Orientalists: Edition en langue anglaise, Lynne Thornton, 1994
The Master Impressionists, Charles Louis Borgmeyer, 1913
Alger et ses peintres, 1830–1960, Marion Vidal-Bué, 2000
Gazette Des Beaux-arts, 1904
Les peintres à Dieppe et ses environs: Varengeville, Pourville et Arques-la-Bataille, Bruno Delarue, Caroline Chaine, Pierre Ickowicz, 2009
French Painting from David to Toulouse-Lautrec: Loans from French and American Museums and Collections. An Exhibition Held from February 6 Through March 26, Metropolitan Museum of Art (New York, N.Y.), 1941

References

External links 

Albert Lebourg at the Musée d'Orsay, Paris
 Agence photographique de la réunion des Musées nationaux
 Images d'art, Les œuvres des musées Français
 Site du ministère de la culture et de la communication
 New York Art Resources Consortium (NYARC)

1849 births
1928 deaths
People from Bernay, Eure
French landscape painters
Post-Impressionist artists
Impressionist artists
Modern painters
19th-century French painters
French male painters
20th-century French painters
20th-century French male artists
Chevaliers of the Légion d'honneur
Officiers of the Légion d'honneur
Recipients of the Legion of Honour
19th-century French male artists